Irene Bitto (born 2 November 1993) is an Italian professional racing cyclist.

See also
 Top Girls Fassa Bortolo

References

External links
 

1993 births
Living people
Italian female cyclists
Place of birth missing (living people)
Cyclists from the Province of Treviso